The canton of Pierre-de-Bresse is an administrative division of the Saône-et-Loire department, eastern France. Its borders were modified at the French canton reorganisation which came into effect in March 2015. Its seat is in Pierre-de-Bresse.

It consists of the following communes:
 
Authumes
Beaurepaire-en-Bresse
Beauvernois
Bellevesvre
Bosjean
Bouhans
La Chapelle-Saint-Sauveur
Charette-Varennes
La Chaux
Dampierre-en-Bresse
Devrouze
Diconne
Frangy-en-Bresse
Fretterans
Frontenard
Lays-sur-le-Doubs
Mervans
Montjay
Mouthier-en-Bresse
Pierre-de-Bresse
Le Planois
Pourlans
La Racineuse
Saillenard
Saint-Bonnet-en-Bresse
Saint-Germain-du-Bois
Savigny-en-Revermont
Sens-sur-Seille
Serley
Serrigny-en-Bresse
Le Tartre
Thurey
Torpes

References

Cantons of Saône-et-Loire